The 2010 Sacramento Mountain Lions season was the second season for the Sacramento Mountain Lions and the first since relocating from the San Francisco Bay Area. The team finished with a 4–4 record and third in the league.

Offseason
After unusually poor attendance at the California Redwoods' 2009 home games (the team was the only one to not have a single game with an attendance of over 10,000 fans), the Redwoods announced they would be leaving AT&T Park in San Francisco for either San Jose, California or Sacramento, California. Sacramento (and Hornet Stadium) was ultimately chosen, and the team was renamed the "Sacramento Mountain Lions" in a fan contest.

UFL draft

Personnel

Staff

Roster

Schedule

Standings

Game summaries

Week 1: at Hartford Colonials

Week 2: vs. Florida Tuskers

Over 20,000 Sacramento fans filed into Hornet Stadium to watch the Mountain Lions overcome a ten-point fourth-quarter deficit to become the first team to beat the Florida Tuskers in the regular season (snapping a seven-game win streak for Florida), 24–20. Daunte Culpepper completed 26 of 42 passes for 374 yards, three touchdowns, and an interception. This included the 33-yard go-ahead touchdown pass with thirty-one seconds left to play. Brooks Bollinger threw for his sixth career 300-yard game in the UFL with 328, completing 23 of 41 yards for a touchdown and an interception. The win gave the Mountain Lions (1–1) their first win since relocating to Sacramento and the loss gave Florida (1–1) their first ever even .500 record.

Week 3: at Omaha Nighthawks

Week 5: vs. Las Vegas Locomotives

Week 6: at Florida Tuskers

Week 7: vs. Hartford Colonials

The thirty-four combined points at halftime was the most scored in the first thirty minutes in a game this season, and the Colonials also gave up the league's first ever punt return for a touchdown. But Hartford overcame an early 14-0 deficit to defeat the Sacramento Mountain Lions, 27-26 in front of a crowd of over 13,000 at Hornet Stadium. After missing a potential game-winning field goal against Las Vegas the previous week, plus 34 and 22-yard field goals earlier in the game, Taylor Mehlhaff redeemed himself by nailing a 23-yarder as time expired to beat the Mountain Lions for only their second win of the season. (both coming against Sacramento)

Week 8: at Las Vegas Locomotives

Sacramento attempted to avenge a 26-3 home loss earlier in the season to Las Vegas and did so with a 27-24 win on the road at Sam Boyd. The Mountain Lions survived a scare after the Locos tied the game at 24 in the fourth quarter, after Sacramento lead 21-0 in the second. Chase Clement was stellar in his debut for the Locos, throwing a touchdown and running for two in Las Vegas's comeback attempt that came up just a bit short. The Mountain Lions are the only team not named Florida to defeat the Locos.

Week 9: vs. Omaha Nighthawks

References

Sacramento Mountain Lions Season, 2010
Sacramento Mountain Lions seasons
Sacramento Mountain Lions